Ian Christianson (born March 6, 1991) is an American professional soccer player.

Career

Early career
Christianson played four years of college soccer at Georgetown University between 2009 and 2012. With Georgetown he made 78 appearances in which he scored 14 goals and recorded 10 assists. While at college, Christianson appeared for USL PDL clubs Chicago Fire Premier and Reading United AC. On June 29, 2012 he scored his first goal for 
Reading United in a 4-0 victory over Bermuda Hogges.

Professional
On January 17, 2013, Christianson was selected 22nd in the 2013 MLS SuperDraft by New York Red Bulls. He missed the entire 2013 season due to an injury suffered during the preseason. Christianson was loaned to USL Pro club Orlando City on July 25, 2014. He made his first start for Orlando City on August 2, 2014 in a 4-1 victory over Charlotte Eagles. Christianson was recalled by New York and on September 20, 2014 made his league debut for Red Bulls in a 4-1 victory over Seattle Sounders FC.

Christianson was waived by the Red Bulls on February 17, 2015.

On March 27, 2015, Christianson signed with Whitecaps FC 2 of the United Soccer League.

Career statistics

References

External links 
 

1991 births
Living people
American soccer players
Georgetown Hoyas men's soccer players
Chicago Fire U-23 players
Reading United A.C. players
New York Red Bulls players
Orlando City SC (2010–2014) players
Whitecaps FC 2 players
Association football midfielders
Sportspeople from Cedar Rapids, Iowa
Soccer players from Iowa
New York Red Bulls draft picks
USL League Two players
Major League Soccer players